Charles Barrett may refer to:

Charles Barrett (water polo) (born 1901), Irish water polo player
Charles D. Barrett (1885–1943), U.S. Marines officer
Charles Golding Barrett (1836–1904), English entomologist (lepidopterist)
Charles Leslie Barrett (1879–1959), Australian naturalist, journalist, author and ornithologist
Charles W. Barrett  (1869–1947), American architect with Barrett & Thomson
C. K. Barrett (Charles Kingsley Barrett, 1917–2011), British biblical scholar
Red Barrett (Charles Henry Barrett, 1915–1990), American baseball player

See also
Charley Barrett (1893–1924), American football player